Tatiana Igorevna Gorbunova (born 23 January 1990) is a Russian rhythmic gymnast and Olympic champion.

Career 
Gorbunova was a member of the gold medal-winning Russian group at the 2007 World Championships in Patras, Greece. She was also a member of the Russian group that competed at the 2008 Summer Olympics in Beijing and won the gold medal in the rhythmic group competition.

As of 2014, she was the executive secretary of the Russian Rhythmic Gymnastics Federation.

Detailed Olympic results

References

External links
 
 
 

1990 births
Living people
Russian rhythmic gymnasts
Gymnasts at the 2008 Summer Olympics
Olympic gymnasts of Russia
Olympic gold medalists for Russia
People from Naberezhnye Chelny
Olympic medalists in gymnastics
Medalists at the 2008 Summer Olympics
Medalists at the Rhythmic Gymnastics World Championships
Sportspeople from Tatarstan
20th-century Russian women
21st-century Russian women